The La Cantera Formation is a Late Aptian, geologic formation in Argentina. Fossil theropod tracks have been reported from the formation. The formation, deposited under lacustrine conditions, also has provided fossil plants, insects, fish and gastropods.

Fossil content 
Among the following fossils are reported from the formation:

Insects 
Hemiptera
 Canteronecta irajae
 Notonecta mazzoniae

Flora 

 Alisporites similis
 Rugubivesiculites sp.
 Trisaccites microsaccatus
 Podosporites sp.
 Classopollis simplex
 Callialasporites trilobatus
 Cycadopites follicularis
 Crybelosporites sp.
 Appendicisporites sp.
 Cicatricosisporites australiensis
 Deltoidospora sp.
 Leptolepidites major
 Taurocusporites segmentatus
 Staplinisporites caminus
 Triporoletes reticulatus
 Coptospora sp.
 Couperisporites sp.
 Stephanocolpites mastandreai
 Clavatipollenites hughesii
 Leiosphaeridia hyalina
 L. menendezii
 Balmeiopsis limbatus
 Huitrinipollenites transitorius

See also 
 List of dinosaur-bearing rock formations
 List of stratigraphic units with theropod tracks

References

Bibliography 

 
 
 
  
 
 

Geologic formations of Argentina
Lower Cretaceous Series of South America
Cretaceous Argentina
Aptian Stage
Siltstone formations
Sandstone formations
Conglomerate formations
Lacustrine deposits
Ichnofossiliferous formations
Fossiliferous stratigraphic units of South America
Paleontology in Argentina
Geology of San Juan Province, Argentina
Geology of San Luis Province